Catherine Barclay and Limor Zaltz defeated Joanne Limmer and Angie Woolcock in the final, 6–4, 6–4 to win the girls' doubles tennis title at the 1991 Wimbledon Championships.

Seeds

  Kristin Godridge /  Nicole Pratt (first round)
  Joanne Limmer /  Angie Woolcock (final)
  Zdeňka Málková /  Eva Martincová (quarterfinals)
  Catherine Barclay /  Limor Zaltz (champions)

Draw

Draw

References

External links

Girls' Doubles
Wimbledon Championship by year – Girls' doubles